Ana Macarena Rodríguez Pérez (born 10 June 1978 in Mendoza, Argentina) is an Argentine field hockey player. She competed for the Argentina national field hockey team for the first time in counted matches during Sergio Vigil's coaching years, but returned to the team with Carlos Retegui in 2010, winning the 2010 World Cup and the silver medal at the 2012 Summer Olympics. Macarena also won three Champions Trophy (2010, 2012 and 2014) and two Pan American Cups.

In 2014, Macarena was chosen as the new team's captain as soon as Santiago Capurro started as coach, succeeding 8-time FIH Player of the Year winner Luciana Aymar, who decided to retire after the 2014 Women's Hockey Champions Trophy.

References

External links 
 

1978 births
Living people
Las Leonas players
Argentine female field hockey players
Olympic field hockey players of Argentina
Field hockey players at the 2012 Summer Olympics
Olympic medalists in field hockey
Olympic silver medalists for Argentina
Medalists at the 2012 Summer Olympics
Pan American Games silver medalists for Argentina
Sportspeople from Mendoza, Argentina
Field hockey players at the 2011 Pan American Games
Field hockey players at the 2015 Pan American Games
Pan American Games medalists in field hockey
Medalists at the 2011 Pan American Games
Medalists at the 2015 Pan American Games